Bontddu, Dolgellau, Gwynedd, Wales is a small settlement east of Barmouth, in the community of Llanelltyd.

Description 
Bontddu consists of a small collection of dwellings, a former chapel and a pub called The Halfway House. The settlement is notable as it is the location of Clogau St David's gold mine that traditionally supplies gold for royal wedding rings.

Events 
In 1997 the tanks at Bontddu petrol station leaked which caused a fireball and evacuation.

Tourism 
Local tourism information describes a popular walk in the area of Bontddu:
'follows the 100 metre contour line along the estuary to the East of Borthwnog. Directly behind us walk up into the RSPB (Garth Gell) reserve and on up toward Cwm Mynach and beyond to the wilds of the Harlech Dome. Bear left from the latter path and double back behind the village of Bontddu and join the old drovers track across to Pont Scethin which allegedly was the scene of many highway robberies in the 17th century'.

References

External links 

www.geograph.co.uk : photos of Bontddu and surrounding area
 Mawddachestuary.co.uk - What's on in Bontddu

Villages in Gwynedd
Llanelltyd